Maradik is a village in Serbia. It is situated in the Autonomous Province of Vojvodina, in the region of Syrmia (Syrmia District), in Inđija municipality. Maradik is located about 10 km west of Inđija. The village has a 60% Serb ethnic majority and its total population in 2011 was 2,095.

Name
In Serbian, the village is known as Maradik or Марадик, in Croatian as Maradik, and in Hungarian as Maradék.

History
After Hungarian Roman Catholic residents of the village were rejected by bishop Josip Juraj Strossmayer in their request to get Hungarian language speaking priest, their representatives went to Budapest to meet reformed bishop to request collective conversion to Protestantism.

Ethnic groups (2002 census)
Serbs = 1,394 (60.66%) 
Hungarians = 552 (24.02%) 
Croats = 105 (4.57%) 
Yugoslavs = 90 (3.92%)

Historical population
1961: 2,651
1971: 2,350
1981: 2,255
1991: 2,120
2002: 2,298
2011: 2,095

Famous People
Nenad Živković (Debeli Sremac)

References

Sources 
Slobodan Ćurčić, Broj stanovnika Vojvodine, Novi Sad, 1996.

See also
List of places in Serbia
List of cities, towns and villages in Vojvodina

Populated places in Syrmia
Open-air museums in Serbia